Ogden Reservoir is a reservoir in the Piethorne Valley, close to Milnrow and Newhey in the Metropolitan Borough of Rochdale, within Greater Manchester, England.

History

The reservoir was commissioned in 1878 collecting water from Piethorne Brook and Wickenhall Brook, to provide drinking water for Oldham.
 
This water is an excellent and well regarded fishing water. The fishing for roach perch bream carp and pike is outstanding and it is a joy to fish in such a peaceful location situated in the beautiful Pennine Hills. Fish caught in the 2007 and 2008 seasons include Bream to 13 lb, Carp to 28 lb and Pike to 25 lb. Day tickets are available.

In the year 2005, the body of a man was discovered floating on a nearby overflow.

References

Tourist attractions in the Metropolitan Borough of Rochdale
Reservoirs in Greater Manchester